kaeng hang le is a Northern Thai curry dish.

Description 
Kaeng hang le originates from Myanmar. The origins perhaps are closer to the northern Thai border in Myanmar, where a pork curry called wet tha hin (ဝက်သားဟင်း) includes a sour component, just as the Thai version includes tamarind. Hang le is derived from the Burmese words hin lay (spelled hang le), which means "heavy curry." However, Thai people usually prepare it with pork because it mixes well with spices. It tastes a little bit spicy but is also salty and sour. Kaeng hang le is very popular in Northern Thailand and well known as a Thai traditional in a region specialty. In fact, many restaurants in Chiang Mai call it ‘Burmese curry.’

Ingredients and preparation 
Like other Thai curry. There are 2 parts of ingredient which are the paste and the curry. The curry paste including dried chillies, salt, lemongrass, galangal, shallots, garlic, fresh turmeric, shrimp paste (kapi) and spice masala mix. The curry consist of pork belly, ginger, thai shallot, and whole garlic cloves. It is seasoned with dark soy sauce, palm sugar and fish sauce. Santol fruit can be used instead of tamarind to make it more sour and aromatic.

Kaeng hang le is usually made from belly pork, but can be replaced with chicken, beef or fish. For pork, we should choose pork belly but not thick or choose pork ribs for cooking.

Add pork belly to a hot pan until it has taken on some caramelized color and released some fat. Add the curry paste and stir-fry the paste and the pork belly together until fragrant. Add water to cover the pork belly, add the seasoning and then cover and simmer until pork is tender, about 40 minutes.

Eat sticky rice with kaeng hang le

Varieties
Each province has its own recipe, some recipes include sliced ginger, different amounts of black soy sauce result in darkness of the curry. Some recipes have different amount of boiling time result in different thickness. The curry paste also difference each province that sell by local shop. In the modern day sliced pineapple is also added to soften the pork

See also 
 Rendang
 Massaman curry
 Burmese curry
 List of Thai dishes
 List of Thai ingredients
 Curry
 Northern Thailand

References 

Bush, A. (2009, February 18). How To Make: Kaeng hang le. Retrieved from Austin Bush Photography: http://www.austinbushphotography.com/blog/how-to-make-kaeng-hang-lay.html
Carter, T. (2014, FEBRUARY 2). kaeng hang le MOO CURRY — NORTHERN THAI PORK BELLY CURRY RECIPE. Retrieved from Gran Tourismo: http://grantourismotravels.com/2014/02/02/gaeng-hang-lay-moo-curry-recipe-2/
Dave. (2012, May 28). hang le curry (kaeng hang le). Retrieved from The Honest Wok: http://www.thehonestwok.com/2012/05/gaeng-hang-lay.html
Jessica. (n.d.). kaeng hang le RECIPE Burmese Pork Belly Curry. Retrieved from Lonely Palate: http://lonelypalate.net/2014/gaeng-hang-lay-recipe-burmese-pork-belly-curry/

External links 
Preparation of kaeng hang le
kaeng hang le recipe
kaeng hang le recipe with video
Thaifoodmaster's Northern style hang le curry recipe (step by step)

Northern Thai cuisine
Southeast Asian curries
Thai curries